13123 Tyson, provisional designation , is a stony Phocaea asteroid and an asynchronous binary system from the inner regions of the asteroid belt, approximately 10 kilometers in diameter. It was discovered on May 16, 1994, by American astronomer Carolyn Shoemaker and Canadian astronomer David Levy at the Palomar Observatory in California, United States. The asteroid was named for Neil deGrasse Tyson, American astrophysicist and popular science communicator.

Orbit and classification 

The stony S-type asteroid is a member of the Phocaea family, a rather small group of asteroids with similar orbital characteristics, named after its largest member, 25 Phocaea. It orbits the Sun in the inner main-belt at a distance of 1.7–3.0 AU once every 3 years and 8 months (1,324 days). Its orbit has an eccentricity of 0.27 and an inclination of 23° with respect to the ecliptic. The first precovery was taken at Palomar's Digitized Sky Survey (DSS) in 1953, extending the asteroid's observation arc by 41 years prior to its discovery.

Physical characteristics

Rotation period 

In February 2015, a rotational lightcurve was obtained by astronomer Petr Pravec at the Astronomical Institute, Czech Republic. It showed a well-defined rotation period of  hours with a brightness amplitude of 0.20 in magnitude. A previous photometric observation in August 2009, at the Oakley Southern Sky Observatory, Australia, gave a lightcurve with a similar period of  hours and a brightness variation of 0.35 magnitude.

Satellite 

Tyson is an asynchronous binary asteroid, with a minor planet moon, designated  in its orbit. The satellite has a rotation period of 3.862 hours. No other physical properties for this binary system has been published.

Diameter and albedo 

According to the survey carried out by NASA's space-based Wide-field Infrared Survey Explorer with its subsequent NEOWISE mission, the asteroid measures 10.9 kilometers in diameter and its surface has an albedo of 0.197, while the Collaborative Asteroid Lightcurve Link assumes an albedo of 0.23 and calculates a smaller diameter of 8.2 kilometers with an absolute magnitude of 12.64.

Naming 

This minor planet was named in honor of American astrophysicist and popular science communicator, Neil deGrasse Tyson (b. 1958). In 1996, he became director of New York's Hayden Planetarium and was the chief scientist for its complete renovation. At the time, Tyson was also a research affiliate at Princeton University. The official naming citation was published by the Minor Planet Center on 11 November 2000.

Notes

References

External links 
 SLA 2009 Conference Neil deGrasse Tyson, Keynote Speaker
 Asteroids with Satellites, Robert Johnston, johnstonsarchive.net
 Asteroid Lightcurve Database (LCDB), query form (info )
 Dictionary of Minor Planet Names, Google books
 Asteroids and comets rotation curves, CdR – Observatoire de Genève, Raoul Behrend
 Discovery Circumstances: Numbered Minor Planets (10001)-(15000) – Minor Planet Center
 
 

013123
Discoveries by Carolyn S. Shoemaker
Discoveries by David H. Levy
Named minor planets
13123 Tyson
19940516